Beaconsfield railway station is located on the Pakenham line in Victoria, Australia. It serves the south-eastern Melbourne suburb of Beaconsfield, and it opened on 1 December 1879.

History

Beaconsfield station opened on 1 December 1879, just over two years after the railway line from Dandenong was extended to Pakenham. The station gets its name from statesman Benjamin Disraeli, Earl of Beaconsfield, who was Prime Minister of the United Kingdom between 1874–1880.

In 1967, the goods siding was closed to traffic, and was removed later in that same year.

In 1976, flashing light signals were provided at the Station/Goff Street level crossing, located nearby in the Down direction of the station, with boom barriers provided later on in 1986.

There is a car-park nearby for travellers. In mid December 2020, a further expansion of an additional car-park of 150 spaces was completed on state-owned land. Improved lighting and CCTV was provided, along with a secure bicycle parking shed and extra bicycle stands. More than 250,000 commuters use the station each year.

On 29 July 2021, the Level Crossing Removal Project announced that the Station Street/Goff Street level crossing will be grade separated by 2025, with a new road bridge to be built over the railway line.

The former railway house at 20 Beaconsfield Avenue was built in 1888 and, in 1900, was acquired for use as a Station Master's house. It is now a private residence.

Platforms and services

Beaconsfield has one island platform with two faces. It is located at the corner of Woods Street and Beaconsfield Avenue. From the opposite side of the railway line, it is located along Kenilworth Avenue.

It is serviced by Metro Trains' Pakenham line services.

Platform 1:
  all stations and limited express services to Flinders Street

Platform 2:
  all stations services to Pakenham

By late 2025, it is planned that trains on the Pakenham line will be through-routed with those on the Sunbury line, via the new Metro Tunnel.

Transport links

Ventura Bus Lines operates two routes via Beaconsfield station, under contract to Public Transport Victoria:
 : Berwick station – Eden Rise Shopping Centre
 : Pakenham station – Westfield Fountain Gate

References

External links

 Melway map at street-directory.com.au
 Beaconsfield Railway Station at Beaconsfield Progress Association website.
 Photograph of the station in 1910 from the Picture Victoria website.

Railway stations in Melbourne
Railway stations in Australia opened in 1879
Railway stations in the Shire of Cardinia